Gagea tisoniana is an Italian species of small bulbous perennial plants lily family. It is found in the central part of the Italian peninsula (Tuscany, Lazio, Umbria, and Marche).

References

tisoniana
Flora of Italy
Plants described in 2007